Clearfield is an unincorporated community in Douglas County, Kansas, United States.  It is located nine miles northeast of Baldwin City.

History
A post office was opened in Clearfield in 1885, and remained in operation until it was discontinued in 1900.

References

Further reading

External links
 Douglas County maps: Current, Historic, KDOT

Unincorporated communities in Douglas County, Kansas
Unincorporated communities in Kansas